Daria Mikhailovna Shmeleva (born 26 October 1994) is a Russian professional track cyclist. She rode at the 2015 UCI Track Cycling World Championships along with Anastasia Voynova and won silver medal in the team sprint event.

Major results

2013
2nd 500m Time Trial, UEC European U23 Track Championships
2014
1st  Team Sprint, UEC European Track Championships (with Elena Brejniva and Anastasia Voynova)
Memorial of Alexander Lesnikov
1st Team Sprint (with Anastasia Voynova)
2nd Keirin
3rd 500m Time Trial
1st Team Sprint GP von Deutschland im Sprint (with Anastasia Voynova)
UEC European U23 Track Championships
1st  Team Sprint (with Anastasia Voynova)
2nd 500m Time Trial
Grand Prix of Tula
2nd 500m Time Trial
3rd Keirin
3rd Team Sprint (with Lidiya Pluzhnikova)
2015
UEC European  Track Championships
1st  Team Sprint (with Anastasia Voynova)
3rd 500m Time Trial
1st Team Sprint, Grand Prix of Tula (with Anastasia Voynova)
Memorial of Alexander Lesnikov
1st Team Sprint (with Anastasia Voynova)
3rd Keirin
3rd Sprint
UEC European U23 Track Championships
1st  Team Sprint (with Anastasia Voynova)
2nd 500m Time Trial
2nd Team Sprint, GP von Deutschland im Sprint (with Anastasia Voynova)
2nd Sprint, Trofeu CAR Anadia Portugal
3rd 500m Time Trial, Cottbuser SprintCup
2016
1st Team Sprint, Memorial of Alexander Lesnikov (with Anastasia Voynova)
1st Team Sprint, Grand Prix of Tula (with Anastasia Voynova)
Panevežys
2nd Sprint
3rd Keirin
Grand Prix Minsk
2nd 500m Time Trial
3rd Sprint
2017
UCI World Track Championships
1st  Team Sprint (with Anastasia Voynova)
1st  500m Time Trial
UEC European  Track Championships
1st  Team Sprint (with Anastasia Voynova)
3rd Sprint
3rd 500m Time Trial
Grand Prix of Tula
1st Keirin
2nd Sprint
Prilba Moravy
1st Keirin
1st Sprint
2nd Sprint, Grand Prix of Moscow

References

External links

1994 births
Living people
Russian female cyclists
Cyclists from Moscow
Cyclists at the 2016 Summer Olympics
Cyclists at the 2020 Summer Olympics
Olympic cyclists of Russia
Olympic silver medalists for Russia
Olympic bronze medalists for the Russian Olympic Committee athletes
Olympic medalists in cycling
Medalists at the 2016 Summer Olympics
Medalists at the 2020 Summer Olympics
UCI Track Cycling World Champions (women)
Russian track cyclists
European Championships (multi-sport event) gold medalists
Cyclists at the 2019 European Games
European Games medalists in cycling
European Games gold medalists for Russia
European Games bronze medalists for Russia